Anil Murali (12 April 1964 – 30 July 2020) was an Indian actor in Malayalam cinema. He acted in more than 200 films. He started out in the film industry as a villain before later taking on character roles. He died on 30 July 2020, as a result of liver-related ailments.

Personal life and death
He was born to Muraleedharan Nair and Sreekumari Amma at Thiruvananthapuram. He has 3 elder brothers and a younger sister. 
Anil was married to Suma. They have a son, Aditya and a daughter, Arundati.

He died on 30 July 2020 at Aster Medcity, Kochi due to liver disease He was aged 52 at the time of his death. He was cremated at Santhikavadam crematorium in Thiruvananthapuram. He is survived by his wife, whom he married in 1994, and their two children.

Filmography

Malayalam

 Kanyakumariyil Oru Kavitha (1993)
 Daivathinte Vikrithikal (1994)
Peter Scott   (1995) as Khalid
 Rajakeeyam (1995) as Govind
 Boxer  (1995) as Dinesh
 Vamsam (1997)
 Nakshatratharattu (1998) as Jayan's friend
 Stalin Sivadas (1999) as Xavier
 Pakal Pooram (2002)
 Vaalkkannaadi (2002)
 Valathottu Thirinjal Nalamathe Veedu (2003)
 Ivar (2003)
 Ammakkilikoodu (2003)
 Nerariyan CBI (2005)
 Chanthupottu (2005)
 Chinthamani Kolacase (2006)
 Classmates (2006)
 Kisan (2006)
 Chacko Randaaman (2006)
 Lion (2006)
 Shyaamam (2006)
 Prajapathi (2006)
 The Don (2006)
 Jayam(2006)
 Balram vs Tharadas (2006)
 Mahasamudram (2006)
 Baba Kalyani (2006)
 Avan Chandiyude Makan (2007) as S.I Hari
 Kichamani MBA (2007)
 Panthaya Kozhi (2007) as Anirudan
 July 4 (2007)
 Indrajith (2007)
 Anchil Oral Arjunan (2007)
 Nasrani (2007)
 Rock & Roll (2007)
 Annan Thambi (2007)
 Lollipop (2008)
 The Thriller (2008)
 Kurukshetra (2008)
Twenty 20 (2008)
Mayabazar (2008) as Kallavandi Vikraman
 Aayirathil Oruvan (2009)
 Currency (2009)
 Kerala Cafe (2009)
 Robin Hood (2009)
 Black Dalia (2009)
 Puthiya Mukham (2009)
 Pokkiri Raja (2010)
 24 Hrs (2010)
 Cheriya Kallanum Valiya Poleesum (2010)
 Oridathoru Postman (2010)
 Kanmazha Peyyum Munpe (2010)
 Thanthonni (2010)
 Chaverpada (2010)
 Bodyguard (2010)
 Njaan Sanchaari (2010)
 Nayakan (2010)
 Kayam (2010)
 City of God (2011)
 Manikiakkallu (2011)
 Vellaripravinte Changathi (2011)
 Violin (2011)
 Black Truth (2011)
 Bombay March 12 (2011)
 Collector (2011)
 Asuravithu (2012)
 Masters (2012)
 Red Alert (2012)
 Thiruvambadi Thamban (2012)
 Achante Aanmakkal (2012)
 Hero (2012)
 Vaadhyar (2012)
 Mullamottum Munthiricharum (2012)
 Manthrikan (2012)
 No. 66 Madhura Bus (2012)
 Thappana (2012)
 Ayalum Njanum Thammil (2012)
 Run Baby Run (2012)
 Hide N' Seek (2012)
 Chettayees (2012)
 Karmayodha (2012)
 Cowboy (2013)
 Blackberry (2013)
 Amen (2013)
 Black Ticket(2013) as C.I.Mahesh
 Buddy (2013)
 Oru Yathrayil (2013)
 Vishudhan (2013) as Rafeeq
Ithu Paathiramanal (2013)
Immanuel (2013)
 @Andheri (2014)
 2nd Innings (2014)
Dolphin Bar (2014)
Polytechnic (2014)
Avatharam (2014)
100 Degree Celsius (2014)
Iyobinte Pusthakam (2014)
KL 10 Patthu (2015)
Ramaleela (2017)
Aakashamittayee (2017)
Shadow (2018)
 Joseph (2018)
 Uyare (2019)
 Brother's Day (2019)
 Moonam Pralayam (2019)
 Forensic (2020)
 Alice in Panchalinadu (2021)
 Kunjeldho (2021)
 Professor Dinkan (2022)

Tamil
 6 (2013)
 Nimirndhu Nil (2014) 
 Thani Oruvan (2015)
 Kanithan (2016)
 Appa (2016)
 Kodi (2016)
 Enga Amma Rani (2017)
 Thondan (2017)
 Nagesh Thiraiyarangam (2018)
 Mr. Local (2019)
 Jiivi (2019)
 Naadodigal 2 (2020)
 Walter (2020)
 Visithiran (2022)

Telugu
 Ragile Kasi (2011)
 Janda Pai Kapiraju (2015)

Television
2012 - Akashadoothu (Surya TV)
2011 - Swamiye Saranam Ayyappa (Surya TV)
2011 - Kadamatathachan (Surya TV)
2010 - Chakravakam (Surya TV)
2010 - Sindhooracheppu (Amrita TV)
2008 - Mounanombaram (Kairali TV)
2005 - Kadamattathu Kathanar (TV series) (Asianet)
2000 - Jwalayayi (Doordarshan)
1991 - Krishnapaksham (DD 4)
1997 - Vamsham (DD 1)

Web series 
 2019 - Queen Web Series as M. Natarajan

References

 Anil Murali, One India Entertainment.
 Anil Murali, Malayalam Movie and Music Database.
 Meet The Star, Kerala.com
 Anil Murali Passed away, Manorama Online

External links

 Anil Murali at MSI

Indian male film actors
Male actors from Thiruvananthapuram
Male actors in Malayalam cinema
2020 deaths
1968 births
20th-century Indian male actors
21st-century Indian male actors
Male actors in Telugu cinema
Male actors in Tamil cinema
Indian male television actors
Male actors in Malayalam television
Deaths from liver disease